Palaeoceroptera is a genus of flies belonging to the family lesser dung flies.

Species
Palaeoceroptera boliviensis (Duda, 1929)
Palaeoceroptera clefta Marshall, 1998

References

Sphaeroceridae
Diptera of South America
Taxa named by Oswald Duda
Sphaeroceroidea genera